Opel Performance Center (OPC) is a division of the German automobile manufacturer Opel, initially set up as a subsidiary in 1997. The main focus of OPC is the development of performance derivatives of the Opel range, such as the hot hatch Corsa OPC and Astra OPC.

The OPC name is also used in some motorsport activities such as the VLN. In the United Kingdom, where Opel vehicles are sold under the Vauxhall marque, the VXR name is used instead. Former DTM racer Volker Strycek is managing director of Opel Performance Center.

History
Opel Performance Center GmbH was established in 1997. The first OPC car was an Astra G launched in 1999.

Prior to OPC models, Opel used the Grand Sport Injection (GSi) designation in the mid 1980s and the end of the 1990s for its high performance and hot hatch derivatives. Opel has offered many GSi models, e.g. the Manta B GSi, Kadett E GSi or Astra F GSi. The last vehicle with the GSi moniker was the Corsa C GSi, which was offered in the Opel model range until 2004. After three years, Opel decided to use the GSi moniker for the Corsa D in 2007.

With the Insignia B OPC Line being discontinued in 2022, the OPC sub-brand will be replaced by GSe, which now stands for Grand Sport electric.

OPC models
The retail versions developed by OPC are sold under the Opel brand, as special versions of the standard Opel vehicles. They are typically painted in a bright shade of blue, called Arden Blue (though other colours are available too). Their competition in Europe are, e.g. the ST versions of Ford's European range and Volkswagen's GTI and R range. In the United Kingdom, Vauxhall's versions of OPC models are badged as VXR.

Previous models
OPC has developed the following special versions of Opel vehicles:

1998–2004 Opel Vectra – a version of the sedan and hatchback.
 2005–2011 Opel Astra H OPC – again, based on the three door Astra, this time the three door hatchback (GTC) version of the Astra H.
 2005–2010 Opel Zafira B OPC – a version of the Opel Zafira B compact MPV.
 2005–2008 Opel Vectra C OPC – a version of the Opel Vectra C five door liftback (GTS) and five door station wagon (Caravan).
 2006–2010 Opel Meriva A OPC – a version of the Opel Meriva mini MPV.
2014–2019 Opel Corsa E OPC – a version of the Opel Corsa E three door hatchback.

Concept cars

Over the fifteen years of existence, OPC presented the following concept cars:
 2001 Opel Astra Coupe OPC X-Treme – based on the DTM V8 powered version of the Opel Astra Coupe.
 2002 Opel Corsa OPC – a very production ready version of the three door Opel Corsa C that, however, never made it to production.
 2003 Opel Vectra OPC – contrary to the commercial Vectra OPC, this one was based on the pre facelift Vectra GTS and was powered by a tuned 1.9 CDTI engine.
 2004 Opel Astra High Performance Concept – a study version of the later 2005 Opel Astra H OPC, but painted in "power red".
 2014  Opel Astra J OPC EXTREME – a super sports car version of the Opel Astra J GTC.

Motorsport
In November 2012, Opel announced the formation of the "Astra OPC Cup" at the 2013 VLN.

Slogans
OPC's corporate tagline is "OPC. Pure Passion".

See also

Irmscher
Steinmetz Opel Tuning
VXR
VX Racing
Holden Special Vehicles

References

External links

Opel-OPC (Ireland)
Opel Motorsport website (German)

Opel subsidiaries
Automotive companies established in 1997
Official motorsports and performance division of automakers
German racecar constructors